HJK may stand for:

 Helsingin Jalkapalloklubi (HJK Helsinki), an association football club, Finland
 Helsingin Jalkapalloklubi (women), an association football club, Helsinki, Finland
 Helsingin Jääkiekkoklubi (HJK Helsinki), Finnish ice hockey club.
 Hærens Jegerkommando, Norwegian special forces unit